Charlie and the Chocolate Factory is a media franchise based on the 1964 novel of the same name by British author Roald Dahl. It includes two books, two live-action theatrical films, two video games, and a ride.

Books

Charlie and the Chocolate Factory (1964)

Charlie and the Chocolate Factory is a children's book by British author Roald Dahl. The story features the adventures of young Charlie Bucket inside the chocolate factory of eccentric chocolatier Willy Wonka. Charlie and the Chocolate Factory was first published in the United States by Alfred A. Knopf, Inc. in 1964 and in the United Kingdom by George Allen & Unwin in 1967.

Charlie and the Great Glass Elevator (1972)

Charlie and the Great Glass Elevator is the sequel to Charlie and the Chocolate Factory, continuing the story of Charlie Bucket and Willy Wonka as they travel in the Great Glass Elevator. Charlie and the Great Glass Elevator was first published in the United States by Alfred A. Knopf in 1972, and in the United Kingdom by George Allen & Unwin in 1973.

Unfinished third book
A follow-up to the book was planned, called Charlie in the White House. Charlie's family and Mr. Wonka are invited by President Gilligrass to have dinner at the White House, as thanks for rescuing the spacecraft from its attack by the Vermicious Knids. Dahl only wrote the first chapter, which is on display at the Roald Dahl Museum and Story Centre in Great Missenden.

Films

Willy Wonka & the Chocolate Factory (1971)

Willy Wonka & the Chocolate Factory is a 1971 musical film adaptation of the 1964 novel Charlie and the Chocolate Factory by Roald Dahl. It was directed by Mel Stuart, and starred Gene Wilder as Wonka. The film tells the story of Charlie Bucket as he receives a golden ticket and visits Willy Wonka's chocolate factory with four other children from around the world. Filming took place in Munich in 1970, and the film was released on June 30, 1971. It received positive reviews, but it was a box office disappointment despite the fact that it recouped its budget. However, it developed into a cult film due to its repeated television airings and home video sales. In 1972, the film received an Academy Award nomination for Best Original Score.

Charlie and the Chocolate Factory (2005)

Charlie and the Chocolate Factory is a 2005 film adaptation of the 1964 book of the same name by Roald Dahl. The film was directed by Tim Burton. The film stars Freddie Highmore as Charlie Bucket and Johnny Depp as Willy Wonka. The storyline concerns Charlie, who takes a tour he has won, led by Wonka, through the most magnificent chocolate factory in the world. Development for another adaptation of Charlie and the Chocolate Factory, filmed previously as Willy Wonka & the Chocolate Factory, began in 1991, 20 years after the first film version, which resulted in Warner Bros. providing the Dahl Estate with total artistic control. Prior to Burton's involvement, directors such as Gary Ross, Rob Minkoff, Martin Scorsese and Tom Shadyac had been involved, while Warner Bros. either considered or discussed the role of Willy Wonka with Nicolas Cage, Jim Carrey, Michael Keaton, Brad Pitt, Will Smith and Adam Sandler. Burton immediately brought regular collaborators Johnny Depp and Danny Elfman aboard. Charlie and the Chocolate Factory represents the first time since The Nightmare Before Christmas that Elfman contributed to the film score using written songs and his vocals. Filming took place from June to December 2004 at Pinewood Studios in the United Kingdom, where Burton avoided using digital effects as much as possible. Charlie and the Chocolate Factory was released to critical praise and was a box office success, grossing approximately $475 million worldwide.

Tom and Jerry: Willy Wonka and the Chocolate Factory (2017)
Tom and Jerry: Willy Wonka and the Chocolate Factory is a 2017 American animated direct-to-video musical comedy film starring the cat-and-mouse duo Tom and Jerry. Produced by Warner Bros. Animation and Turner Entertainment Co., it is the first Tom and Jerry direct-to-video film to be distributed by Warner Bros. Home Entertainment internationally and is also the final Tom and Jerry direct-to-video film to be involved with Warner Bros. Animation's founder Hal Geer, who died on January 26, 2017. The film is an animated adaptation of the 1971 film Willy Wonka & the Chocolate Factory (which in turn is based on the 1964 book Charlie and the Chocolate Factory by Roald Dahl) with the addition of Tom and Jerry as characters and seen through their point of view.

The film was released via digital media on June 27, 2017, and released on home media on July 11, 2017. It was panned by critics, who found Tom and Jerry's inclusion in the story to be forced and unnecessary.

Wonka (2023)

A prequel film, focusing on a Young Willy Wonka and his adventures prior to opening the world's most famous chocolate factory, titled Wonka, will be released on December 15, 2023 with Paul King directing and David Heyman producing. On May 24, 2021, it was announced that Timothée Chalamet had been cast to portray Young Willy Wonka in the film.

Television

Untitled television series (TBA)
On November 27, 2018, Netflix announced they are developing an "animated series event" based on Roald Dahl's books, which will include a television series based on Charlie and the Chocolate Factory and the novel's sequel Charlie and the Great Glass Elevator.

Stage

Roald Dahl's Willy Wonka (2004)

Roald Dahl's Willy Wonka is a musical that combines elements of both Roald Dahl's book Charlie and the Chocolate Factory and of the 1971 movie Willy Wonka and the Chocolate Factory with newly created material. The musical has several versions: the original version which premiered in 2004, the Junior version, the Kids version, and the Theatre for Young Audience version. All are owned by Music Theatre International, the company that owns the Willy Wonka license.

The Golden Ticket (2010)

The Estate of Roald Dahl sanctioned an operatic adaptation called The Golden Ticket. It was written by composer Peter Ash and British librettist Donald Sturrock. The Golden Ticket has completely original music and was commissioned by the American Lyric Theater, Lawrence Edelson (producing artistic director), and Felicity Dahl. The opera received its world premiere at Opera Theatre of Saint Louis on 13 June 2010, in a co-production with American Lyric Theater and Wexford Festival Opera.

Charlie and the Chocolate Factory (2013)

A musical based on the novel, titled Charlie and the Chocolate Factory premiered at the West End's Theatre Royal, Drury Lane in May 2013 and officially opened on 25 June. The show is directed by Sam Mendes, with new songs by Marc Shaiman and Scott Wittman, and stars Douglas Hodge as Willy Wonka. The production broke records for weekly ticket sales. Coincidentally, Hodge was also the voice of a Charlie and the Chocolate Factory audiobook, as part of a package of Roald Dahl CDs read by celebrities.

Video games
There are two Charlie and the Chocolate Factory video games, one made in 1985 and another in 2005. The former is based on the book of the same name while the latter is based on the 2005 film adaptation.

Ride

Charlie and the Chocolate Factory: The Ride is a dark ride located in the Cloud Cuckoo Land area of Alton Towers theme park, Staffordshire, England. It is based upon the famous Roald Dahl book of the same name, and takes its thematic inspiration from the illustrations of Quentin Blake. The ride is split into two segments, the first being a boat ride along the chocolate river inside Willy Wonka's Chocolate Factory. Passengers encounter all the characters from the book (going from Augustus Gloop to Veruca Salt) either as simple animatronics or CGI projections. After disembarking the boats the second segment begins with a short pre-show video (involving Mike Teevee). The video is presented as if the viewers are actually trapped within the TV set. The ride continues inside one of two 'Great Glass Elevators' which simulate passengers taking an airborne trip through the rest of the factory. Each elevator is a static room with semi-translucent walls and ceiling on which CGI animations are projected from the outside, and only the floor trembles slightly to give the impression of movement.

Cast and crew

Principal cast

Crew

Reception

Box office performance

Critical and public response

Academy Awards

References

 
Mass media franchises introduced in 1964
Warner Bros. Pictures franchises
Mass media franchises
Film series introduced in 1971